Idi Othman Guda (19 August 1941 – 30 January 2015) was a senator in the Federal Republic of Nigeria (1999 to 2003) and held the office of chairman of the senate committee on environment during his tenure. He was elected for the Bauchi Central Constituency of Bauchi State as a member of the People's Democratic Party.

References

1941 births
2015 deaths
Peoples Democratic Party members of the Senate (Nigeria)
20th-century Nigerian politicians
21st-century Nigerian politicians